Iguanura is a monoecious genus of flowering plant in the palm family from Southeast Asia, commonly called pinang.  Closely related to the Heterospathe palms, they are noted for producing a wide variety of fruit forms.  Its name combines the Spanish word for "lizard" with the Greek word for "tail".

Description
This taxon is composed of very small, undergrowth palms which may be solitary or clustering, rarely exceeding 4 m in height. Stilt roots form in some species and most lack a crownshaft.  The leaves may be regularly or irregularly pinnate, with or without a notched apice, entire or segmented, all with toothed margins.  Many produce new leaves of various colors which are unusually long-lasting, indeed, even the mature green leaves are especially persistent and will often become host to algae or various epiphytes over time.

The inflorescence usually emerges within the leaf crown but emerges below in those with rudimentary crownshafts.  Branched or spicate, it contains male and female flowers, both with three sepals and three petals.  Of the bees, wasps, ants and flies observed visiting the male flowers, only the ants were also consistent visitors to the female flowers.  The fruit may be spherical or egg-shaped, bilobed, spindle-shaped, or flat and five-pointed.  Colored green, white, brown, pink or red, the fruit carries one seed which usually takes the shape of the endocarp.

Distribution and habitat
Often forming large colonies, they grow throughout the peninsulas of Thailand and Malaysia, Borneo, and Sumatra growing in tropical rain forest and in mountainous forest up to 1200 m.

Cultivation and uses
While generally decorative, their particular tropical needs have prevented much widespread cultivation.  The leaves may be used for temporary shelters and the roots and fruit of I. wallichiana are reported to have contraceptive properties.

References

External links
 
 Images at Fairchild
 Fairchild Guide to Palms: Iguanura
 PACSOA

Areceae
Arecaceae genera